Events from the year 1776 in France

Incumbents
 Monarch – Louis XVI

Events
 August - The guild organisation Marchandes de modes is founded.

Births
 
1 April – Sophie Germain, mathematician, physicist, and philosopher (died 1831)
4 August – Pierre-Simon Ballanche, writer and counterrevolutionary philosopher (died 1847)

Full date missing 
Peter Gilles, composer (died 1839)

Deaths
4 May – Jacques Saly, sculptor (born 1717)
25 August – Germain-François Poullain de Saint-Foix, writer and playwright (born 1698)
17 October – Pierre François le Courayer, writer (born 1681)

Full date missing 
Augustin Roux, encyclopedist (born 1726)
 Marie Durand, Protestant martyr (d. 1711)

See also

References

1770s in France